Bazuk, also rendered as Bazok, may refer to:
 Bazuk-e Arbab
 Bazuk-e Malek